Sud Department (originally Sud-Est Department) was one of the original four departments of Ivory Coast. It was established in 1961, along with Centre Department, Nord Department, and Sud-Ouest Department. During Sud Department's existence, departments were the first-level administrative subdivisions of Ivory Coast.

The department was established as Sud-Est Department. Using current boundaries as a reference, the territory of Sud-Est Department was composed of Abidjan Autonomous District, Comoé District, Gbôklé Region, Lagunes District, Lôh-Djiboua Region, San-Pédro Region, and Zanzan District.

In 1963, Est Department was created by dividing Sud-Est Department. As a result of this division, Sud-Est Department was renamed Sud Department. Using current boundaries as a reference, the territory of Sud Department was composed of Abidjan Autonomous District, Gbôklé Region, Lagunes District, Lôh-Djiboua Region, San-Pédro Region, and Sud-Comoé Region.

In 1969, Sud Department and the other five existing departments of the country were abolished and replaced with 24 new departments. The territory of Sud Department became the new departments of Abidjan, Aboisso, Adzopé, Agboville, Divo, and Sassandra.

Notes

References
"Districts of Côte d'Ivoire (Ivory Coast)", statoids.com, accessed 17 February 2016.

Former departments of Ivory Coast
1961 establishments in Ivory Coast
1969 disestablishments in Ivory Coast
States and territories established in 1961
States and territories disestablished in 1969